The West Polesian language (захыднёполіськая мова) is the East Slavic language spoken in southwestern Belarus, in northwestern Ukraine and adjoining regions of Poland. There is controversy regarding whether West Polesian is a dialect of Belarusian or Ukrainian, or a separate microlanguage (as has been proposed by linguist Alexander Dulichenko).

Distinct variants or dialects of West Polesian are used in everyday speech. Attempts were made in the 1990s by Nikolai Shelyagovich to develop a standard written language, although his efforts received almost no support and the campaign eventually ceased. In particular, writer Nil Hilevich and some others spoke against  Shelyagovich, claiming that he represented a threat to the national integrity of Belarus, and labelled "Yotvingian separatism".

History
Rare examples of irregular written use of local dialects were noted in Polesia in the 16th and 17th centuries already. In the 19th century, Franz Savich wrote poetry in Polesian, and later Nikolai Yanchuk. In 1901, certain Polesian words and phrases were used by Alexander Kuprin in his story "The Silver Wolf". In 1907, the first printed Polesian primer (Rusinski lemantar) in Latin script was published in Pinsk.

The formation of the Polesian literary language itself began in 1988 thanks to the efforts of the philologist and poet Nikolai Shelyagovich. Then the social and cultural association "Polisse" (Полісьсе) was created and the development of a written norm of a special Polesian ("Yotvingian" in the terminology of Shelyagovich and his supporters) language began. In 1990, a constituent conference was held, at which various ethnographic and linguistic problems of Polesia were discussed, and, in particular, the creation of a written Polesian language.

In the newly created literary language in 1988-1990, several inserts with the title «Балесы Полісся» (Pages of Polesia) were published in the Belarusian newspaper «Чырвоная змена» (Chyrvona Zmena), several rotary issues of the "information bulletin" (small newspaper) "Zbudinne" ("Awakening" ). In 1990-1995, the newspaper "Zbudinne" was published every 2 weeks, was widely sold in newsstands in the Brest Region and in Minsk, and one could subscribe to it. The circulation of the newspaper averaged about 2-2.5 thousand copies. Also in this language were written several theses for the Yotvingian (Polesian) scientific-practical conference, held in Pinsk on April 13–14, 1990. The rest of the abstracts were written in Russian, Belarusian and Ukrainian. In 1992, a book of chess miniatures "Jitvezha Shakhova mynyatyur" was published in the Western Polesian language in Shelyagovich's version.

Orthography

«Yotvingian»
In 1990, an alphabet was proposed by Nikolai Shelyagovich.

Klimchuk's script
Phonetic spelling, which is used by dialectologist Fedor Klimchuk to record spoken texts, as well as to write literary works and translations. Mostly the language of the texts is the dialect of the author's native village (Simanavichi, Dorogichyn district). Created on the basis of Belarusian orthography, the texts emphasize): The greatest literary work is the translation of the New Testament.

See also 
 Simple speech

References 

East Slavic languages